Shaanxinus is a genus of Asian sheet weavers that was first described by A. V. Tanasevitch in 2006.

Species
 it contains sixteen species, found in Vietnam, Taiwan, and China:
Shaanxinus anguilliformis (Xia, Zhang, Gao, Fei & Kim, 2001) – China
Shaanxinus atayal Lin, 2019 – Taiwan
Shaanxinus curviductus Lin, 2019 – Taiwan
Shaanxinus hehuanensis Lin, 2019 – Taiwan
Shaanxinus hirticephalus Lin, 2019 – Taiwan
Shaanxinus lixiangae Lin, 2019 – Taiwan
Shaanxinus magniclypeus Lin, 2019 – Taiwan
Shaanxinus makauyensis Lin, 2019 – Taiwan
Shaanxinus meifengensis Lin, 2019 – Taiwan
Shaanxinus mingchihensis Lin, 2019 – Taiwan
Shaanxinus rufus Tanasevitch, 2006 (type) – China
Shaanxinus seediq Lin, 2019 – Taiwan
Shaanxinus shihchoensis Lin, 2019 – Taiwan
Shaanxinus shoukaensis Lin, 2019 – Taiwan
Shaanxinus tamdaoensis Lin, 2019 – Vietnam
Shaanxinus tsou Lin, 2019 – Taiwan

See also
 List of Linyphiidae species (Q–Z)

References

Araneomorphae genera
Linyphiidae
Spiders of China